Harvest TV is a 24/7 Christian devotional satellite channel in Malayalam language, owned By Bibi George Chacko

Harvest TV started as a cable TV channel in 2011 in Thiruvananthapuram, Kerala. By 2013, Harvest TV started telecasting on various DTH networks.

References

Malayalam-language television channels
Religious television channels in India
Christian television stations
Television stations in Thiruvananthapuram